Adrian "A.J." Valenzuela (born July 29, 1998) is an American soccer player who plays as a defender for FC Tucson in USL League One.

Career

FC Tucson
In February 2020, Valenzuela signed for the club ahead of the 2020 season. He made his professional debut for the club on 25 July 2020, coming on as an 81st-minute substitute for Samuel Biek in a 2–1 away victory over Fort Lauderdale CF. In this same match, Valenzuela scored the first goal of his professional stint in Tucson, a 90th-minute winner assisted by Azaad Liadi.

References

External links
A.J. Valenzuela at San Diego State Athletics
A.J. Valenzuela at FC Tucson

1998 births
Living people
San Diego State Aztecs men's soccer players
FC Tucson players
Lane United FC players
USL League Two players
USL League One players
American soccer players
Soccer players from Arizona
Association football defenders